Andrzej Jaskot  (born 26 January 1971 in Mielec) is a retired Polish professional footballer. Jaskot played several seasons in the Polish Ekstraklasa with Stal Mielec, Hutnik Kraków and Widzew Łódź.  He also made one appearance for the Poland national football team against Ukraine in 1998.

References

External links
 

1971 births
Living people
Polish footballers
Poland international footballers
Stal Mielec players
Widzew Łódź players
Zagłębie Lubin players
Aluminium Konin players
Ceramika Opoczno players
Odra Opole players
Dyskobolia Grodzisk Wielkopolski players
Hutnik Nowa Huta players
Polish football managers
Stal Mielec managers
People from Mielec
Sportspeople from Podkarpackie Voivodeship
Association football defenders